The 2022–23 Northern Ireland Football League Cup (known as the BetMcLean Cup for sponsorship purposes) was the 36th edition of Northern Ireland's football knock-out cup competition for national league clubs, and the eighth edition of the competition as the Northern Ireland Football League Cup. The competition was contested by the 36 member clubs of the Northern Ireland Football League, commencing on 6 August 2022 with the preliminary round and concluding with the final on 12 March 2023. The competition was sponsored by McLean Bookmakers, the title sponsors of the cup since the 2017–18 season.

Cliftonville were the defending champions, following a 4–3 win over Coleraine after extra time in the 2022 final to win the cup for the sixth time overall. However, this season they were eliminated in the semi-finals. Linfield were the eventual winners, after they defeated Coleraine 2–0 in the final to win the competition for a record-extending 11th time overall, their first win since the 2019 final. Coleraine finished as runners-up for the second consecutive season after their seventh defeat in a League Cup final overall. This set a new record in the competition for the most defeats in a final.

Format and schedule
The competition was open to the 36 members of the Northern Ireland Football League (NIFL). The eight lowest-ranked clubs from the previous season's league system (the clubs that finished 5th–11th in the NIFL Premier Intermediate League along with the newly-promoted club, Ballymacash Rangers) entered the preliminary round, with the 4 winners joining the remaining 28 NIFL clubs in the first round. The 16 highest-ranked clubs from the previous season's league system (all 12 NIFL Premiership clubs along with the top 4 NIFL Championship clubs) were then seeded in the first round to avoid drawing each other. The first round was the only round of the competition in which seeding is used. From there on the competition used an open draw with a standard knock-out format, with the remaining rounds consisting of the second round, quarter-finals, semi-finals and the final. Replays were not used in the competition, with all matches using extra time and penalties to determine the winner if necessary.

Results
The league tier of each club at the time of entering the competition is listed in parentheses.

(1) = NIFL Premiership
(2) = NIFL Championship
(3) = NIFL Premier Intermediate League

Preliminary round
The Preliminary round draw was made on 21 July 2022. The matches were played on 6 August and 9 August 2022.

|-
|colspan="4" style="background:#E8FFD8;"|6 August 2022
|-

|-
|colspan="4" style="background:#E8FFD8;"|9 August 2022
|-

|}

First round
The First round draw was made on 20 August 2022. The matches were played on 13 and 14 September 2022. The top 16 league clubs from the previous season were seeded in this round in order to avoid drawing each other.

|-
|colspan="3" style="background:#E8FFD8;"|13 September 2022
|-

|-
|colspan="3" style="background:#E8FFD8;"|14 September 2021
|-

|}

Second round
The Second round draw was made on 17 September 2022. The matches were played on 4 October 2022.

|-
|colspan="3" style="background:#E8FFD8;"|4 October 2022
|-

|}

Quarter-finals
The draw was made on 12 October 2022. The quarter-finals were played on 1 November 2022.

|-

|}

Semi-finals
The semi-final matches were played on 6 December 2022.

|-

|}

Final
The final was played on 12 March 2023 at Windsor Park, Belfast. This was the second consecutive season that the League Cup final was played on a Sunday.

References

Lea
2022–23 European domestic association football cups
2022-23